The Gazetteer of India, Union Territory: Goa, Daman and Diu is an official publication from the Government of Goa, published in 1979, and contains a lot of background information and history about the region of Goa.

This book's editor was Dr V. T. Gune, then Director of Archives, Archaeology and the Executive Editor and Member Secretary of the Goa Gazetteer editorial board. This publication came from the Government of the Union Territory of Goa, Daman and Diu's Gazetteer Department. It was printed by the Government Central Press of Bombay (now Mumbai).

It has not been updated since its publication, and no new volume of its kind has been put out yet.

This book was published less than two decades after Portuguese colonial rule ended. This probably gets reflected in the attempt to be extra-critical of Portuguese rule, while play-up the positive changes brought in post-1961.

History of Goa
Reference works in the public domain
1979 non-fiction books
Gazetteers of India